There are 81 species of tunicate (subphylum Tunicata) recorded in Ireland.

Class Ascidiacea (sea squirts)

Order Aplousobranchia

Family Clavelinidae

Clavelina lepadiformis (light-bulb sea squirt)

Family Didemnidae

Didemnum fulgens
Didemnum maculosum 
Didemnum vexillum (carpet sea squirt, an invasive species recorded in Strangford Lough in 2012)
Diplosoma listerianum 
Diplosoma spongiforme
Lissoclinum perforatum
Trididemnum cereum 
Trididemnum tenerum

Family Holozoidae

Distaplia rosea

Family Polycitoridae

Archidistoma aggregatum

Family Pycnoclavellidae
Pycnoclavella aurilucens
Pycnoclavella producta
Pycnoclavella stolonialis

Order Enterogona

Family Ascidiidae

Ascidia conchilega
Ascidia mentula
Ascidia virginea
Ascidiella aspersa
Ascidiella scabra
Phallusia mammillata

Family Cionidae

Ciona intestinalis (vase tunicate)

Family Polyclinidae

Aplidium densum
Aplidium elegans
Aplidium glabrum 
Aplidium nordmanni
Aplidium pallidum
Aplidium proliferum
Aplidium punctum
Aplidium turbinatum
Morchellium argus (red-flake ascidian)
Polyclinum aurantium
Synoicum incrustatum
Synoicum pulmonaria

Order Phlebobranchia

Family Corellidae

Corella eumyota 
Corella parallelogramma

Family Diazonidae

Diazona violacea

Family Perophoridae

Perophora listeri

Order Pleurogona

Family Styelidae

Botrylloides leachii
Botryllus schlosseri (star ascidian / golden star tunicate)
 Dendrodoa grossularia
Distomus variolosus
Polycarpa fibrosa 
Polycarpa gracilis
Polycarpa pomaria
Polycarpa scuba
Stolonica socialis
Styela clava (stalked sea squirt, club sea squirt, club tunicate, Asian tunicate, leathery sea squirt, rough sea squirt)
Styela coriacea

Order Stolidobranchia

Family Molgulidae (sea grapes)
Molgula citrina
Molgula complanata  
Molgula manhattensis  
Molgula occulta  
Molgula oculata   (sea grape)

Family Pyuridae

Boltenia echinata
Microcosmus claudicans
Pyura microcosmus
Pyura squamulosa  
Pyura tessellata 

Pelagic tunicates (free-swimming)

Class Appendicularia (larvaceans)

Order Copelata

Family Oikopleuridae
5 species

Family Fritillariidae
4 species

Class Thaliacea (pelagic tunicates)

Order Doliolida

Family Doliolidae
3 species

Order Salpida (salps)

Family Salpidae (salps)
7 species

Order Pyrosomida (pyrosomes)

Family Pyrosomatidae (pyrosomes)
1 species

References

Identification
Harant, H.  & Vernieres P., 1933. Tuniciers I. Faune de France  n° 27 101 p., 94 fig.PDF (4 Mo)
Harant, H.  & Vernieres P., 1938 Tuniciers II. Faune de France n° 33 60 p., 64 fig. PDF (2 Mo)

External links
Marine species identification portal

Ireland, tuni
Tunicates
tunicates